Bukowno is a town in Lesser Poland Voivodeship, south Poland.

Bukowno may refer to the following places:
Bukowno, Silesian Voivodeship (south Poland)
Bukowno, Choszczno County in West Pomeranian Voivodeship (north-west Poland)
Bukówno, Masovian Voivodeship (east-central Poland)